Itsuwatobu Dam  is a rockfill dam located in Kumamoto Prefecture in Japan. The dam is used for irrigation and water supply. The catchment area of the dam is 1.6 km2. The dam impounds about 8  ha of land when full and can store 739 thousand cubic meters of water. The construction of the dam was started on 1995 and completed in 2002.

See also
List of dams in Japan

References

Dams in Kumamoto Prefecture